Hinsdale Greyhound Park was a greyhound racing track in Hinsdale, New Hampshire, United States. It closed in 2008. It was originally Hinsdale Raceway, a horse racing track that began operation in 1958. During its heyday it drew thousands of spectators from all over New England and even Montreal. Harness racing prospered at Hinsdale throughout the 1960s, '70s and early '80s, until track management, in an attempt to reduce costs, converted the facility to year-round greyhound racing. This was popular too for several years, but competition from casinos in neighboring states slowly eroded the fan base, and the last several years of operation were a financial struggle. In late 2008 the track finally succumbed and ceased operations under a mountain of debt. The racetrack was demolished a few years later.

See also
 Seabrook Greyhound Park

References

Sports venues completed in 1958
2008 disestablishments
Buildings and structures in Cheshire County, New Hampshire
Defunct greyhound racing venues in the United States
Harness racing venues in the United States
Defunct sports venues in New Hampshire
Defunct horse racing venues in New Hampshire
1958 establishments in New Hampshire
2008 disestablishments in New Hampshire
Hinsdale, New Hampshire